Phil McMahon (born 11 November 1960) is a New Zealand cricketer. He played in one List A match for Wellington in 1994/95.

See also
 List of Wellington representative cricketers

References

External links
 

1960 births
Living people
New Zealand cricketers
Wellington cricketers
Cricketers from Wellington City